Paractaenum novae-hollandiae (common name - reflexed panic grass) is a grass (family Poaceae), native to Western Australia. It is an annual herb growing from 0.2 to 0.5 m high, on sands and loams. Its green-purple flowers may be seen from March to September.

It was first described in 1812 by Palisot de Beauvois, and is the type species of the genus.

References

External links
Paractaenum novae-hollandiae occurrence data from Australasian Virtual Herbarium

Flora of Western Australia
Plants described in 1812
Panicoideae